Sergio Raúl Vergara Romero (born 15 December 1988) is a Paraguayan international footballer who plays for Deportivo Capiatá on loan from Club Olimpia, as a left back.

Career
Vergara has played for Sportivo Luqueño since 2010.

He made his international debut for Paraguay in 2011.

References

External links

1988 births
Living people
Paraguayan footballers
Paraguay international footballers
Paraguayan Primera División players
Sportivo Luqueño players
Cerro Porteño players
Club Libertad footballers
Club Olimpia footballers
Deportivo Capiatá players

Association football fullbacks